DXDB may refer to:
 DXDB-AM, an AM radio station broadcasting in Malaybalay, branded as Radyo Bandilyo.
 DXDB-FM, an FM radio station broadcasting in Iligan, branded as Hope Radio.